Volodymyr Naumenko (19 July 1852 – 8 July 1919) was a well known pedagogue and public figure in the city of Kiev as well as a good publicist. Upon the establishment of the Central Council of Ukraine for couple of weeks he served as its chairman until Mykhailo Hrushevsky returned from his exile. Later Naumenko also was appointed as a minister of education. He was executed by the Cheka for "counter-revolutionary activity".

In 1893-1906 Naumenko was a chief editor of the monthly historical magazine Kievskaya starina (Kievan Past).

Biography

Origin and family
Naumenko was born on July 19, 1852 in Novhorod-Siversky. His father Pavlo Osypovych Naumenko was a director of gymnasium (school). About his family tree Naumenko wrote the following:

Childhood Naumentko spent in Novhorod-Siversky and Bila Tserkva. In Kiev he lived since 1861. In 1868 Naumenko graduated from the 2nd Kiev Gymnasium where he studied with his good friend Oleksandr Rusov. Naumenko also met with his father's friend Mykhaylo Maksymovych. From September 12, 1869 to May 31, 1873 Naumenko studied at the Department of History and Philology of Kiev University. After that he worked as intern at his native 2nd gymnasium.

Hromada - public life
On October 18, 1874 Naumenko married Vira Mykolaivna Shulhina, an aunt of Oleksander Shulhyn. At that time she graduated from the Kiev Institute of noble girls. About same time Naumenko became a member of the Kiev (Old) Hromada. Since 1875 he was its treasurer, while in 1876 Naumenko became among that group of dozen who after publishing the Ems Ukaz adopted decision to move their activities abroad. Since the 1900s Naumenko practically headed the organization and was a member of the Southwestern Department of Russian Geographic Society that was created in 1873 on the initiative of Old Hromada members. In 1906-10 he participated in activities of Prosvita. In 1902 Naumenko acquired the portion of land where Taras Shevchenko was buried and took care of all the hassle of caring after it and keeping it in order.

Life of publicist
In 1893 to 1906 Naumenko was a chief editor of historic-ethnographic and literature monthly magazine Kievan Past. He is author of 115 its articles. During the times of Naumenko, Kievan Past transformed from a pure popular science publishing to a representative body of Ukrainophilia, on pages of which was unfolding a struggle for free development of the Ukrainian literature. It also published articles that was describing a political situation in Eastern Ukraine, Galicia, Bukovina.

In the magazine were published articles that upheld the right of Ukrainian people on their own language. At the end of 1890 the magazine became participant of discussion about independence of the Ukrainian language and literature and about their place among other Slavic languages. There is a famous polemic that Naumenko conducted it on pages of the magazine with Timofey Florinskiy who refused to recognize Ukrainian as a separate language rather than a Little-Russian dialect. It was in result of the active efforts of Naumenko that the magazine in 1898 received a permission on publication of fiction in Ukrainian language and creation of Ukrainian printshop; two years later there was opened a bookstore of "Kievan Past".

The journalistic activity of Naumenko was tied and with other periodicals: at the end of 1870 - start of 1880 he worked with the newspaper "Labor", in 1898 took part in creation of newspaper "Kiev responses", in 1905-06 along with I.Luchytsky established newspaper "Liberty and right", a publishing body of the Kiev Committee of Constitutional Democratic Party. At the end of 1906 he attained a certificate on the right to publish in Kiev a magazine "Ukraine" which had to become successor of Kievan Past, however the publication was terminated already at the end of 1907.

Pedagogical activity
For many years Volodymyr Naumenko was a teacher of gymnasium teaching literature in the 2nd Kiev Gymnasium (1880), the State Female Gymnasium of St. Olga (1883), Collegiate of Pavel Galagan, Kiev Funduklei Gymnasium (1889), Vladimir Cadet Corps (1893). For his work he received multiple awards such as the Order of St Anna (IV, 1883), Order of St Stanislaus (II, 1886), Order of St Ana (II, 1893), Order of St Vladimir (IV, 1897). On February 28, 1898 Naumenko was granted a title of Merited Teacher.

Volodymyr Naumenko entered history of Ukrainian Pedagogy not only as a brilliant practical teacher, but also as an experienced Methodist-innovator and theoretic. Almost annually he was receiving invitation from various regional governments to head teacher summer courses and he never refused. Naumenko systematically was conducting methodic classes with pedagogues of Sunday school of the Kiev Grammar Society serving as its chairman in 1897-1907. For many years he was being invited to check knowledge of pupils of Kiev orphanages. These kind of examinations Naumenko was transforming into exemplary classes not only for students, but primarily for teachers and educators.

In the Vernadsky Institute of manuscripts are preserved the text of lectures from different years that Volodymyr Naumenko read to teachers of people's schools. He constantly was expressing his conviction that the most effective school education may exist only when it is conducted in the native language.

References

External links
 An article of Volodymyr Naumenko on the website of the Academical Institute of History of Ukraine
 Ukrainian pedagogical museum: Advocate of the Ukrainian National Education (to 160th Anniversary of Volodymyr Naumenko birthday)
 Biography at the website "Ukrainians in the world"
 Ukrainian pedagogical Technics in characters. 10th - 19th centuries. Ed. O.Sukhomlynova. "Lybid". Kiev, 2005.
 Nehodchenko, O.P. Magazine "Kievskaya Starina" (1882-1906) as an original and unique phenomenon of the Ukrainian culture
 Biography of Volodymyr Naumenko at the website of Vernadsky Library
 Skoropad, I.V. V.Naumenko as an innovator in educational field in the second half of 19th century

1852 births
1919 deaths
People from Novhorod-Siverskyi
People from Novgorod-Seversky Uyezd
Acting heads of state of Ukraine
Education ministers of Ukraine
Government ministers of the Ukrainian State
Hromada (society) members
Ukrainian lexicographers
Victims of Red Terror in Soviet Russia
People executed by Russia by firing squad